Duk may refer to:

Geography 
Duk, a former fort on the Mount of Temptation near Jericho in the West Bank
Duk, Isfahan, a village in Isfahan Province, Iran
Duk, Kohgiluyeh and Boyer-Ahmad, a village in Kohgiluyeh and Boyer-Ahmad Province, Iran
Duk, Gachsaran, a village in Kohgiluyeh and Boyer-Ahmad Province, Iran
Duk, Mazandaran, a village in Qaem Shahr County, Mazandaran Province
Duk County, a county of Jonglei, South Sudan
Duk River, part of the Chao Phraya River basin in Thailand
Kaft Galleh Duk, a village with a population of 20 in Khuzestan Province, Iran
Tha Pla Duk, a village and tambon of Mae Tha District, in Lamphun Province, Thailand

Television 
Tiny and Mr Duk, two puppet characters from UK children's TV show, The Saturday Show by Dave Chapman and Damian Farrell

Other uses
Duk-Duk, a men-only secret society of the Tolai people of New Britain
Donald Duk, a coming-of-age novel written by Frank Chin, first published in February 1991

People 
Kim Duk (wrestler), Zainichi Korean wrestler
Randall Duk Kim (born 1943), a Korean American stage, television and film actor
Luís Lopes (born  2000), association footballer, commonly known as Duk

See also

DUK (disambiguation)
Dook (disambiguation)
Pla duk (disambiguation)
Duck (disambiguation)
Tteok, a class of Korean rice cakes often spelled as "ddeock", "duk", "dduk", "ddeog", or "thuck"
Duke, a title of social class and nobility